IEC Technical Committee 57 is one of the technical committees of the International Electrotechnical Commission (IEC). TC 57 is responsible for development of standards for information exchange for power systems and other related systems including Energy Management Systems, SCADA, distribution automation & teleprotection.

Working groups 
TC 57 consists of several working groups, each of which is responsible for development of standards within its domain. The active working groups are listed below.

External links 
 IEC TC 57
 IEC TC 57 WGs

057